Cimolus luteus is a species of leaf-footed bug in the family Coreidae. It was first described by Harry Brailovsky Alperowitz in 2001 and is found in French Guiana, Panama, Suriname, and Venezuela.

References

Coreini
Insects described in 2001